Bratsberg is a name of Norwegian origin and may refer to:

People
Harry Bratsberg (also Harry Bratsburg), an American actor and director also known as Harry Morgan

Places
Bratsberg, Trøndelag, a village in Trondheim municipality in Trøndelag county, Norway
Bratsberg amt, the former name for the Norwegian county now known as Telemark
Bratsberg, Minnesota, a community in the state of Minnesota in the United States

Newspapers
Bratsberg-Demokraten, Norwegian newspaper published from 1908 to 1929
Bratsberg Amtstidende, Norwegian newspaper published from 1830 to 1901
Bratsberg Blad, a newspaper later called Breviks Dagblad

Other
Bratsberg Hydroelectric Power Station, hydroelectric power station located in Trondheim in Sør-Trøndelag, Norway
Bratsberg Line, railway line between Eidanger and Notodden in Telemark, Norway
Bratsberg Church, a church in Trondheim in Trøndelag county, Norway